Nabil Fekir (born 18 July 1993) is a French professional footballer who plays as an attacking midfielder for La Liga club Real Betis and the France national team.

An academy graduate of Lyon, he was promoted to the senior squad in July 2013. Fekir became a first-team regular in his second season, when he was named the Ligue 1 Young Player of the Year. He made 192 appearances for Les Gones, scoring 69 goals and also gaining team captaincy in 2017.

Fekir made his debut for France in March 2015 and was chosen in their squad that won the 2018 FIFA World Cup.

Club career

Youth
Fekir joined the youth academy of Olympique Lyonnais at the age of 12, and two years later he was released for not being strong enough. He rejoined Vaulx-en-Velin and continued his youth career at Saint-Priest, where he was tracked by scouts from across France. At one point Lyon's local rivals Saint-Étienne were very keen to sign Fekir, but he held out for Lyon to sign him again in 2011. He said "I wanted to show Lyon that they made a mistake".

Lyon
Fekir was included in the Lyon first team squad for the first time on 30 July 2013, remaining as an unused substitute in 1–0 home win over Grasshopper in the Champions League third qualifying round first leg. He finally made his Lyon first team debut on 28 August 2013, replacing Yassine Benzia at half time in a 2–0 Champions League play-off round second leg away loss to Real Sociedad, which saw the club eliminated from the tournament after a 4–0 aggregate defeat. Three days later he made his Ligue 1 debut, playing the entire match in 2–1 away defeat to Evian TG. On 27 April 2014, against Bastia in a 4–1 Ligue 1 home win, he scored his first competitive goal (in the 23rd minute) for Lyon's first team and assisted one goal each for Bakary Koné and Alexandre Lacazette. Fekir made a total of 17 appearances in all competitions in his first season (2013–14) with Lyon's first team, scoring one goal.

During the 2014–15 season, he featured regularly for the first team and by 19 March 2015 he had scored 11 goals and assisted 7 in 25 2014–15  season Ligue 1 games, earning him his first international call up. On 17 May 2015, he was named as the Ligue 1 Young Player of the Year and earned a spot in the Team of the Year. He finished the 2014–15 Ligue 1 season with 13 goals and 9 assists.

On 29 August 2015, Fekir scored a hat-trick in a 4–0 Ligue 1 away win at Caen. He missed most of the 2015–16 season with torn knee ligaments.

On 23 February 2017, Fekir scored a hat-trick and assisted Mouctar Diakhaby's 89th-minute goal) in the 2016–17 Europa League round of 32 second-leg 7–1 home win over AZ Alkmaar to be on the scoresheet of a UEFA Europa League or UEFA Champions League match for the first time in his career, by 23 February he had scored 10 goals and provided 10 assists in all competitions for the 2016–17 season.

In early August 2017, following the transfer of Maxime Gonalons to AS Roma a month earlier, Fekir was named captain of the club. On 5 November, he scored two goals in a 5–0 away Ligue 1 victory over fierce rivals AS Saint-Etienne.  After Fekir scored his second goal in the 84th minute, he took off his shirt and brandished his name and number to the Saint-Étienne supporters, who threw objects and spilled onto the field, outraged by the gesture. Referee Clément Turpin led the players away from the field and riot police ran onto the field to restore order. The match was stopped for 40 minutes before the two teams could play out its final five minutes in a virtually empty Stade Geoffroy-Guichard.

In 2017–18, Fekir was part of a prolific forward line alongside Memphis Depay and Mariano; he contributed 18 goals, the Dutchman contributing 19, with the Dominican Republic international totalling 18 for the team. In June 2018, Liverpool negotiated with Lyon for the transfer of Fekir, offering a maximum €60 million.  Fekir agreed personal terms and even had his medical and did a welcome video for the fans, before the transfer collapsed due to a knee issue that appeared during the medical .

Real Betis
On 22 July 2019, Fekir signed a four-year contract with Spanish club Real Betis for an initial fee of €19.75 million and €10 million in add-ons. Lyon will receive 20% of any future sale of the player and as part of the deal, Fekir's younger brother Yassin also transferred between the two clubs. He made his La Liga debut for Los Verdiblancos on 18 August, playing the full 90 minutes in a 2–1 defeat against Real Valladolid, and scored his first goal a week later to open a 5–2 loss against Barcelona.

International career
Fekir made just one appearance for the France national youth football team. He earned one cap at the under-21 level by coming on as a substitute (in the 75th minute) for Corentin Tolisso in the 2015 UEFA European Under-21 Championship qualification play-offs second-leg away match against Sweden on 15 October 2014; France lost the match 4–1 and 4–3 on aggregate and hence did not qualify for the final phase of the 2015 UEFA European Under-21 Championship in the Czech Republic.

Fekir was named in his ancestral Algeria's squad for friendlies against Oman and Qatar in March 2015. However, he withdrew to take part in the French squad for friendlies against Brazil and Denmark. He made his France senior team debut on 26 March 2015 against the former at the Stade de France, replacing Antoine Griezmann for the final 16 minutes of a 3–1 defeat. He scored his first goal for the France senior team on 7 June 2015, in a 3–4 home friendly defeat to Belgium. On 4 September 2015, he made his first start for the France senior team in a 1–0 away friendly win over Portugal during which he ruptured three ligaments in his right knee, putting him out of action for an estimated six months.

On 25 August 2016, Fekir was called back up to the senior squad for the first time since his injury for a friendly against Italy and a 2018 FIFA World Cup qualification match against Belarus. He had to withdraw from the squad three days later, however, due to an injury. On 7 October, he made his competitive debut for France as an 83rd-minute substitute for Antoine Griezmann in the 2018 World Cup qualifying 4–1 win over Bulgaria at the Stade de France.

He was selected in the 23-man French national squad for the 2018 FIFA World Cup in Russia. He played the last nine minutes of the final, a 4–2 win over Croatia at the Luzhniki Stadium, in place of Olivier Giroud.

Style of play

Upon calling him for the France senior squad in March 2015, manager Didier Deschamps said that "Fekir is a player with great potential. I consider that he can bring us something different. He plays in a different role to the others. He can score and set up others to score well."

Personal life
Fekir was born to Algerian parents, who are originally from Menaceur, a small town in Tipaza, Algeria. His father settled in France in 1992 and worked in a metallergy factory for a long time, while his mother was a social worker. He is the oldest of the family's four brothers. His brother, Yassin Fekir, also made his professional debut at Lyon and transferred with him to Betis. Fekir is a Muslim, and gives to charity when unable to fast for Ramadan during the football season.

Career statistics

Club

International

Scores and results list France's goal tally first.

Honours
Real Betis
 Copa del Rey: 2021–22

France
 FIFA World Cup: 2018

Individual
 UNFP Ligue 1 Young Player of the Year:  2014–15
 UNFP Ligue 1 Team of the Year: 2014–15, 2017–18
 UNFP Ligue 1 Player of the Month: October 2017
 La Liga Team of the Season: 2021–22

Orders
 Knight of the Legion of Honour: 2018

References

External links

 Profile at the Real Betis website
 
 

1993 births
Living people
French sportspeople of Algerian descent
French Muslims
Footballers from Lyon
French footballers
Association football midfielders
Association football forwards
Ligue 1 players
FC Vaulx-en-Velin players
Olympique Lyonnais players
La Liga players
Real Betis players
France under-21 international footballers
France international footballers
2018 FIFA World Cup players
FIFA World Cup-winning players
French expatriate footballers
Expatriate footballers in Spain
French expatriate sportspeople in Spain
Chevaliers of the Légion d'honneur